Daniel Librado Azcona Salinas (born January 18, 1984) is a Paraguayan footballer who plays as a goalkeeper.

International career

Paraguayan-born Azcona has played football in Ecuador spanning back to 2009 with LDU Loja. He became an Ecuadorian citizen and was eligible for the Ecuador national football team. He made the cut for the final 23 squad for 2015 Copa América.

Honours

Copa Libertadores Runner Up: 2016

Olimpia Asunción
Paraguayan Primera División (5): 2018 Apertura, 2018 Clausura, 2019 Apertura, 2019 Clausura,2020 Clausura

References

External links 
 
 

1984 births
Living people
People from Caacupé
Paraguayan footballers
Ecuadorian footballers
Paraguayan emigrants to Ecuador
Paraguayan expatriate footballers
Naturalized citizens of Ecuador
2015 Copa América players
Association football goalkeepers
Club Olimpia footballers
12 de Octubre Football Club players
L.D.U. Loja footballers
C.S.D. Independiente del Valle footballers
River Plate (Asunción) footballers
Expatriate footballers in Ecuador